Würzburg Abbey may refer to:

St. Burchard's Abbey, Würzburg
St. Kilian's Abbey, Würzburg
St. James's Abbey, Würzburg
St. Stephen's Abbey, Würzburg